Events from the year 1868 in Russia.

Incumbents
 Monarch – Alexander II

Events

 

 The khanate became a vassal of the Russian Empire.

Births

Nicholas II of Russia - May 18, 1868
Maxim Gorky - March 28, 1868

Deaths

 
 Marija Mesjtjerskaja, courtier  (b. 1844)

References

1868 in Russia
Years of the 19th century in the Russian Empire